Kim Johnson is an American back-up vocalist for headlining artists such as Robin Thicke, Rod Stewart and The Isley Brothers. She has also sung with the funk group Earth, Wind & Fire.

Biography
Kim grew up in Los Angeles, California and started out singing in church. Along with her sisters, Krystal and Kandy, she has worked with several gospel artists, including Andrae Crouch and Shirley Caesar.

JS, which is abbreviated for Johnson Sisters, originally consisted of Kim along with sisters Krystal and Kandy. Krystal however, left the group after marrying Phillip Bailey of R&B group Earth, Wind & Fire. As a duo Kim & Kandy released their debut, and so far, only album, produced by R. Kelly, entitled Ice Cream, in July 2003.  The Johnson sisters have backed for artists such as Michael Jackson, Sting, Christina Aguilera and the Isley Brothers. Singer Ronald Isley took them under his wing and became their manager and introduced them to R. Kelly, who wrote several songs for them.

References

Earth, Wind & Fire members
Living people
Sibling musical duos
Year of birth missing (living people)